Parmjit Singh Dhanda (born 17 September 1971) is a British Labour Party politician who was the Member of Parliament (MP) for Gloucester from 2001 until the 2010 general election, succeeding Tess Kingham as the Labour MP for the seat.

Background
Parmjit Singh Dhanda was born on 17 September 1971 in Hillingdon, West London to immigrant Indian Punjabi Sikh parents, and was brought up in Southall. His mother was a cleaner at a local hospital, whilst his father was a lorry driver. He was educated at Mellow Lane School, a state Comprehensive School in Hayes, Middlesex, before attending the University of Nottingham, where he received a Bachelor of Engineering degree in 1993, and an MA in information technology in 1995.

Dhanda was the first ever Minister to serve in the UK Government of Indian Heritage and remains the only Sikh Minister to date.

Dhanda is a British-Indian, a British-Punjabi and a British-Sikh.

Dhanda is married with two children. He has been a member of the Union of Shop, Distributive and Allied Workers (USDAW) since 1999. He speaks Punjabi and French, in addition to English.

Political career
Dhanda became a Labour Party organiser in West London, Hampshire and Wiltshire in 1996, then went on to be assistant national organiser with Connect in 1998 where he remained until he was elected to Westminster. He was elected as a councillor in the London Borough of Hillingdon in 1998 and served on the council until 2002. As a member of Labour's list for the 1999 European Parliament election, he became the country's youngest European Parliamentary candidate, aged 27.

He was selected to contest the House of Commons constituency of Gloucester at the 2001 general election - the seat Labour required for a parliamentary majority of 1 - following the decision of Tess Kingham to stand down. He made his maiden speech in the Commons on 27 June 2001, in which he made reference to the local newspaper's article stating (upon his selection by the Labour Party) that "the people of Gloucester had not reached a sufficiently advanced state of consciousness to accept a 'foreigner' as the local MP". In parliament, Dhanda became a member of the Science and Technology Select committee from his election until 2003. He helped set up an all-party group on Telecommunications, of which he was Secretary. In December 2004, he was appointed Parliamentary Private Secretary to the Minister for Schools Stephen Twigg.

In 2003, Dhanda was asked by the Prime Minister to second the Queens Humble Address to the Houses of Parliament.

Dhanda retained his seat in 2005 with an increased majority of 4,280 votes. After the election, Dhanda was appointed to the post of Assistant Government Whip. In May 2006, he was appointed Parliamentary Under-Secretary of State for Children, Young People and Families in the Department for Education and Skills. In this post, he implemented the Green Paper 'Care Matters', introducing radical new measures of support for 30,000 children in the care system.  On 28 June 2007, he became Parliamentary Under-Secretary of State for Communities and Local Government  with responsibility for the fire and rescue service, community cohesion and planning.  He was replaced by Sadiq Khan on 6 Oct 2008.

In 2009, he fought a campaign to be Speaker of the House of Commons, obtaining 4.4% of the votes in the first ballot.

At the speaker's conference in October 2009, Dhanda criticised the way that all 23 of Gordon Brown's cabinet were White, whereas Tony Blair's last cabinet had two "ethnic minority" cabinet ministers.  Brown pointed out that he had a Black Attorney General (Baroness Scotland) and an Asian Minister of State for Transport (Sadiq Khan) who sat around the Cabinet table (though only when their ministerial responsibilities are on the agenda).
  
At the 2010 general election, Dhanda lost his seat to Richard Graham of the Conservative Party.
The Telegraph (Calcutta) reported that in December 2010, Dhanda decided to retire from politics, moving from Gloucester to London. He did not seek re-election at the 2015 general election.

Post-parliamentary career
After the 2010 general election, he became a non-executive director of Hanover Housing Association - an association specialising in housing and support for the elderly and as Parliamentary and Campaigns Officer for the Prospect Trade Union.

In 2014, he commissioned research which was published in The Guardian about the lack of representation of BME communities in the Houses of Parliament. In 2015, Dhanda published his political memoirs, My Political Race, An Outsider's Journey to the Heart of British Politics.

Since 2010, Dhanda has run for selection in multiple Labour safe and target seats, including Brent Central (UK Parliament constituency) in 2013, Aberavon in 2014, Ealing North in 2019 and Wycombe in 2022.

References

External links
Parmjit Dhanda Official site
Huffington Post Contributor Profile
labourlist blog
Parliament Failing to Represent UK's Ethnic Diversity
Former MP Found Pig's Head on Driveway
TheyWorkForYou.com - Parmjit Dhanda
Guardian Unlimited Politics - Ask Aristotle: Parmjit Dhanda
BBC Gloucestershire : Parmjit Dhanda 

1971 births
Living people
British people of Indian descent
British people of Punjabi descent
British Sikhs
English people of Indian descent
English people of Punjabi descent
English Sikhs
British politicians of Indian descent
British politicians of Punjabi descent
Alumni of the University of Nottingham
Labour Party (UK) MPs for English constituencies
Councillors in the London Borough of Hillingdon
UK MPs 2001–2005
UK MPs 2005–2010
Members of Parliament for Gloucester